Pallacanestro is the Italian word for basketball. It can refer to the following basketball clubs:

A.S. Junior Pallacanestro Casale
Associazione Pallacanestro Udinese
Auxilium Pallacanestro Torino
Nuova Pallacanestro Gorizia
Nuova Pallacanestro Vigevano 1955 (it)
Pallacanestro Bellinzona
Pallacanestro Biella
Pallacanestro Brescia
Pallacanestro Cantù
Pallacanestro Chieti (it)
Pallacanestro Ferrara
Pallacanestro Firenze (it)
Pallacanestro Forlì 
Pallacanestro Fortitudo Bologna
Pallacanestro Livorno
Pallacanestro Mantovana
Pallacanestro Marsala (it)
Pallacanestro Milano 1958
Pallacanestro Messina
Pallacanestro Olimpia Milano
Pallacanestro Partenope
Pallacanestro Pavia
Pallacanestro Petrarca Padova
Pallacanestro Reggiana
Pallacanestro Roseto
Pallacanestro Sant'Antimo (it)
Pallacanestro Trapani
Pallacanestro Trieste
Pallacanestro Treviso
Pallacanestro Varese
Pallacanestro Venezia
Pallacanestro Virtus Bologna
Pallacanestro Virtus Roma